Makam Piranna Manka is a 1977 Indian Malayalam film, directed by N. R. Pillai and produced by Ponkunnam Varkey. The film stars Jayan, Jayabharathi, KPAC Lalitha and Adoor Bhasi in the lead roles. The film has musical score by V. Dakshinamoorthy.

Cast

Jayan
Jayabharathi
KPAC Lalitha
Adoor Bhasi
Prameela
Sankaradi
Bhageeradhi Amma
Elizabeth
Janardanan
M. G. Soman
Moossathu
Usharani
Veeran

Soundtrack
The music was composed by V. Dakshinamoorthy and the lyrics were written by Ettumanoor Somadasan and Aravind Abhayadev.

References

External links
 

1977 films
1970s Malayalam-language films